Shaokao, also romanized as shao kao, is the Chinese translation of "barbecue". Chinese variants of the practice constitute a significant aspect of Chinese cuisine. In China, it is predominantly found on busy Chinese streets and night markets as a street food sold in food stalls and is a type of xiaochi.  In China and elsewhere, such as in the United States, diners sometimes also order beer as an accompaniment.

Shaokao typically consists of heavily spiced, barbecued foods on skewers. It is available in almost all of the cities in China, and is a prominent dish in Beijing, China, where some restaurants set up food stalls outdoors to purvey the product. Concerns about air pollution generated from shaokao vendors associated with increased smog levels in Beijing have prompted restrictions.

Kaochuan or yangrouchuan 

The main part of shaokao are "Yangrouchuan" or "kaochuan". (yangrouchaun is 羊肉串, this refers to lamb skewers only)
Yangrouchuan typically consists of heavily spiced, barbecued foods on skewers. In China, mutton skewers (Chinese pinyin: kǎochuàn; Uighur: كاۋاپ, kawap), or grilled skewers, skewers, have a long history, from April to July 2012, Ningxia Institute of Cultural Relics and Archaeology. When the fourth archaeological excavation was carried out in the Lehan cemetery, meat skewers were found in the M17 tomb. In the archaeological finds of the Liao Dynasty, it was found that an unearthed mural on the Aohan Banner in Inner Mongolia was painted with three Khitan people in the coffin, sitting around the hot pot and eating skewers and clams. But in modern times, the popularity of skewers spread from Xinjiang to various places around 1980.

In China, skewers often sell other types of grilled foods at the same time, so skewers are often referred to as grills, and kebabs are often used as a synonym for skewers as the most common skewer. The behavior of eating skewers is called eating barbecues, skewers, and the like. Due to the different eating habits of different localities and ethnic groups, the style of skewers varies from region to region.

History
The origin of the kebabs or shaokao is generally considered to be related to the nomadic people, but when it appears and flourishes, the text is unknown. As early as 1800 years ago, there was a kebab in China. The "Portrait of the Han Dynasty" has a stone carving image of the kebab. The Mawangdui No. 1 Han Tomb also unearthed a barbecue fan.
In the 1980s, archaeologists discovered two stone carvings of kebabs in a tomb of the late Eastern Han Dynasty, which was unearthed in Wulibao Village, Linyi City, Lunan. The study found the two paintings. The characters are Han Chinese, and the skewers they grilled are beef and mutton. These two kitchen drawings reflect the folk customs of Lunan in 1800 years. Both of these stone sculptures have the image of kebabs. In addition to that, both of them have special tools for using two forks. They are placed on the diners and grilled, and the fans are bonfired like the kebabs of Xinjiang today. The characters in both paintings are Han Chinese. Therefore, these two kitchen drawings reflect the folk customs of the South Han Lunan. This shows that the statement that the kebabs originated in Xinjiang can be denied. Most people only believe that the Xinjiang kebabs are authentic. However, according to the situation above, the folk food of the Eastern Han Lunan is the source of the kebab.
In the early Ming Dynasty, the beef was cut into cubes, soaked with chopped green onion, salt and tartar sauce for a while. In the late Ming and early Qing dynasties, the Mongolian people cooked the large pieces of beef and mutton for a while, then cooked them with cow dung. Later, after continuous improvement and development, the barbecue technology became more and more perfect. In the twenty-five years of Qing Daoguang (AD 1845), the poet Yang Jingting praised in the Department Department: "The harsh winter barbecue tastes great. The front of the wine cellar is awkward. Fire moxibustion is best for tenderness and tenderness. This barbecue has almost reached a fascinating situation.

Preparation in specific places
Shaokao is prepared with meats, fish and seafood, and vegetables on bamboo skewers that are flame grilled on a barbecue after being heavily seasoned with various spices, including both cumin and Chinese five-spice powder. The skewers can be cooked to order. Barbecue chicken legs and spare ribs are also some of the dishes in shaokao cuisine.

In Sichuan
The five mainstream types of Chinese Shao Kao in Sichuan Province

1. Yi Bin Group – Ba Ba Shao 
Features: They do not clean the ingredients in advance and they usually roast the ingredients when they are in the very fresh condition. They usually add spices when they are roasting the ingredients but some people also prefer to put the ingredients into a bucket which is full of barbecue sauces. For the fire, it must be strong and the food can be toasted well soon. The food which is roasted by the high flame of the fire will be very easy to chew. It's not the end until now, the restaurant always prepares the dipping sauce for the barbecue. They mix soybean powder, chili powder, coriander leaves and also a little bit preserved Szechuan pickle together which makes the roasted meat or vegetables more delicious.
Specialty: Cocktail sausages, the pig nose-bar, Beef Sashimi 

2. Asbestos group 
Features: This group of Chinese barbecue can be derived from the early 1980s, the tool for cooking this kind of food is a tin pot with several small holes which can reach the ingredients. All of the ingredients should be sliced thinly and be brushed with oil. This kind of way of cooking barbecue is in order to keep the original flavor of the ingredients. They do not use that much of spices and they never use cumin power. There are two dipping sauces: sweet and sour sauce; a mixture of chili powder, peanut powder, soybean powder, and sesame powder.
Specialty: fish slices, cicada pupa, rice cold jelly.

3. Xi Chang Group 
Features: Grilled fish and shrimp: XiChang city is located very near to the Qiong Hai and the fishery resources are very abundant. Therefore, fish, shrimps and shells are a distinct scene in the area of Xi Chang Group's barbecue. Brazier Barbecue: The Yi nationality is one of the main inhabitants who live in Xi Chang city and they have the habit to keep a Huo Tang Bar. They always roast the little pig, native chicken which are marinated in advance on the Huo Tang Bar when they celebrate their important festivals. That was the original form of Brazier Barbecue. Now it is developed to another form - Da Qian Barbecue. The big pieces of meat are skewered and put on the border part of the fire bar. Wang-Wang Barbecue: There are no skewers and the steel net is prepared for customers. The customers can roast meat or vegetables by themselves. 
Specialty: Roasted suckling pig, drunken prawns, and baked fish.

4. Le Shan Group 
Features: Why Le Shan Barbecue is very delicious? It is because of its variation. In order to maintain the special flavor of the food, different ingredients need to be coped with different spices. There are two ways to cook it. The first method is that they roast the raw ingredients which are skewered on the fire directly and put oil and any other spices during the roasting process. The second way is that they fry the ingredients first which can make the food more delicious and then roast them. 
Specialty: Baked streaky pork, baked duck tongue, and baked dunk rice.

5. E Mei Group 
Features: It has the same origin as Le Shan Group. One of its uniqueness is that the ingredients are toasted with honey. The second feature is that the barbecue is covered with a layer of oil sauce. Comparing to the Le Shan Group, E Mei Group is more focusing on the replete sauce and the flavor is not that strong. The taboos of E Mei Group barbecue are salty, spicy, and dry. The ingredients are skewered with sauces before they are roasted and the cook will not put anything when ingredients are baking on the fire. Finally, the cook will brush a layer of oil when it's been cooked well. 
Specialty: Roasted pork kidney slices, baked little potato, E Mei Snow.

In Beijing
Most people in Beijing enjoy their lamb skewers or Kao Chuan in roadside grill joints. To make these lamb skewers, it would be required to have lamb shoulder chops, cumin seeds, dried chili flakes, salt, oil, and soaked bamboo skewers. The bamboo skewers are soaked in order to prevent them from burning.

Lamb shoulder chops are chosen because of their marbled meat, this will give the Kao Chuan or lamb skewers their special taste. Then, cumin seeds, chili flakes, and salt are ground. Separate the ground ingredients into two parts, first part for the lamb skewers when they are grilling, second part to be sprinkled on the cooked lamb skewers.

In Xinjiang

Xinjiang is one of the main places to make kaochuan in China. Sheep is the important meat for the diet of local people. Sheep in Xinjiang eat in natural grasslands and grow up in the mountains, the sheep is not likely to get sick. Sheep drink spring water comes out from cleft which is sweet and without pollution. In addition, the lamb selected from the skewers of roast lamb is about 2 years old. The lamb's meat quality is more tender with more moisture content.

Ingredients:
Lamb leg 300g, cooking wine 5g, salt 5g, pepper 5g, soy sauce 5g, vegetable oil appropriate, cumin 5g, chilli powder 5g, white sesame 5g

Cooking steps:

1. Fascia-remove the leg of lamb, wash it and cut it into medium-sized pieces

2. Put into the crisper box, add wine, salt, soy sauce and pepper, mix them evenly, marinate for more than half an hour, pour in appropriate amount of oil before making

3. Mix well, try to coat each piece of meat with a thin layer of oil, and dress the mutton on the bamboo skewer

4. Preheat the air frypan to 200c and fry the lamb kebabs for 5 to 10 minutes.

Prominence
Shaokao can be found in almost all of the cities in China. They are often located along streets that have a strip of bars. In China, some shaokao food stalls also purvey other goods such as produce that are displayed hanging on sticks. In China and the United States, some restaurants specialize in shaokao dishes.

In Beijing
In Beijing, shaokao is a very common and popular food, and some restaurants in Beijing set-up shaokao barbecues outside of the restaurants to purvey them to people walking on the streets. Shaokao stands are sometimes operated by migrant workers in Beijing. Shaokao stand operators are sometimes reported to the police in Beijing by neighbors who complain about the smoke and aroma that gets into homes, as well as about concerns about food poisoning that can occur from improper meat handling and cooking. In 2013, outdoor barbecue stands were banned due to heavy smog conditions. Chinese authorities have stated that shaokao operations and Chunjie fireworks are a significant cause of smog in Beijing.

See also

 Brochette
 Kebab
 List of Chinese dishes
 List of street foods
 Mixed grill
 Chuan (food)

References

Further reading
 

Barbecue
Chinese cuisine
Street food
Meat dishes